Pyrophorus (also known as fire beetles) is a genus of click beetle (family Elateridae). They are one of several genera in the tribe Pyrophorini, all of which are bioluminescent. Their bioluminescence is similar to that of another group of beetles, the fireflies, although click beetles do not flash, but remain constantly glowing (though they can control the intensity; for example, they become brighter when touched by a potential predator). They have two luminescent spots at the posterior corners of the pronotum, and another brighter light organ on the most-anterior surface of the ventral abdomen. This light organ is even brighter and can only be seen when in flight. Bioluminescent click beetles are found throughout tropical, subtropical and temperate America. Species from Texas, Florida, Puerto Rico, and Cuba are now in different genera in the tribe Pyrophorini, such as Deilelater and Ignelater.

Adult Pyrophorus beetles feed on pollen and sometimes small insects, such as aphids or scale insects. Their larvae feed on various plant materials and invertebrates, including the larvae of other beetles. Eggs are luminous and are deposited either on or in the soil. Larvae, like eggs, are luminous. They grow slowly and pupate after an uncertain period of time, but perhaps several years after hatching.

Pyrophorus nyctophanus larvae live in tunnels in the outer layers of termite mounds on the cerrado of Brazil. During summertime they glow at night, attracting prey in the form of other insects.

List of species
 Pyrophorus angustus Blanchard, 1843
 Pyrophorus avunculus Costa, 1972
 Pyrophorus canaliculatus Eschscholtz, 1829
 Pyrophorus carinatus Eschscholtz, 1829
 Pyrophorus clarus Germar, 1841
 Pyrophorus cucujus Illiger, 1807
 Pyrophorus dulcifer Costa, 1972
 Pyrophorus evexus Costa, 1972
 Pyrophorus expeditus Costa, 1972
 Pyrophorus foveolatus Germar, 1841
 Pyrophorus ignigenus Germar, 1841
 Pyrophorus indistinctus Germar, 1841
 Pyrophorus indulcatus Costa, 1972
 Pyrophorus ingens Costa, 1972
 Pyrophorus jocundus Costa, 1972
 Pyrophorus limbatus Candèze, 1863
 Pyrophorus lucidus Candèze, 1863
 Pyrophorus lucifer Illiger, 1807
 Pyrophorus magnus Costa, 1972
 Pyrophorus melitus Costa, 1972
 Pyrophorus mellifluus Costa, 1972
 Pyrophorus mutatus Candèze, 1893
 Pyrophorus nyctophanus Germar, 1841
 Pyrophorus nigropunctatus Drapiez, 1820
 Pyrophorus noctilucus (Linnaeus, 1758)
 Pyrophorus phosphorescens Laporte, 1840
 Pyrophorus pisticus Costa, 1972
 Pyrophorus plagiophthalmus Germar, 1841
 Pyrophorus punctatissimus Blanchard, 1843
 Pyrophorus pyropoecilus Germar, 1841
 Pyrophorus strabus Germar, 1841
 Pyrophorus stupendus Costa, 1972
 Pyrophorus tuberculifer Eschscholtz, 1829
 Pyrophorus validus Costa, 1972
 Pyrophorus veriloquus Costa, 1972

References

Elateridae in SYNOPSIS OF THE DESCRIBED COLEOPTERA OF THE WORLD
Biolib

External links

Elateridae genera
Bioluminescent insects